The History of fu poetry covers the beginnings of the Chinese literary genre of fu. The term fu describes literary works which have certain characteristics of their own. English lacks an equivalent native term (or form). Sometimes called "rhapsodies", sometimes called "rhyme-prose", fu are characterized by qualities of both poetry and prose: both are obligatory. The fu form of literary work is a treatment in a poetic manner, wherein some topic (or topics) of interest, such as an exotic object, a profound feeling, or an encyclopedic subject is described and rhapsodized upon, in exhaustive detail and various angles of view. And, for a piece to be truly considered to be within the fu genre, it must follow the rules of this form, in terms of structure, meter, and so on.

The first known fu in the fully accepted, modern meaning of the term, dates from the later part of the Zhou Dynasty (c. 1046–256 BC), which is also known as
the Warring States period (4th or 5th century BC - 221 BC), since the central regime of the Zhou dynasty had weakened and political power devolved to control by various regional hegemons. During the Han dynasty (206 BC – 220 AD), the fu style developed into one of the Classical Chinese poetry forms. The fu literary-poetic form continued to develop through the Tang Dynasty (618-906 AD), where it even found as great an exponent of this form as the poet Li Bai, although he is less known in modern translation for this than for his shi and yuefu poetry. After this, new forms of poetry and literature continued to arise and spread, and the fu form became less prominent. During the Song dynasty (960 - 1278 AD) the ci form became dominant; and, after Kublai Khan's establishment of the Yuan dynasty in the 13th century, it was the turn of the qu to rule as the poetry style of the times. More recently, the fu form has been the subject of historical study and critical interest.

Origins

Word fu
The term "fu", when applied to Chinese literature, first appears in the Zhou dynasty (during the time period also known as the "Warring States"), where it meant "to present", as in poetic recitations. The term "fu", when not applied to Chinese literature, appears earlier than this with the meaning of "tribute", in the sense of a military contribution of goods or services.

Ancestry
The fu form derives from a long tradition of Chinese poetry and literature. There are also related genres, such as ch'i and chiu.

Classic of Poetry

The fu form was one of the three literary devices traditionally assigned to the songs of the Classic of Poetry (Shijing).  Fu became the name of poetic expositions in which an author or composer created a comprehensive exposition and perform it as a rhapsody.  Han dynasty historian Ban Gu in the "Monograph on Arts and Letters" defined fu as "to recite without singing".

Verses of Chu

Fu poetry is often viewed as a descendant of the Verses of Chu (also known as the Chu Ci or Ch'ü Tz'u) songs combined with the rhetorical expositions of the Intrigues of the Warring States. The Chu Ci is an anthology of Chinese poetry traditionally attributed mainly to Qu Yuan and Song Yu from the Warring States period (ended 221 BC), though about half of the poems seem to have been composed several centuries later, during the Han Dynasty. Particularly, literary historians sometimes see an influence upon the fu from the  "shaman-inspired catalogues of royal luxury" of the Verses of Cu pieces such as appear in "Zhao Hun" (or the somewhat similar "Da Zhao").

First fu
The first fu is unknowable, both due to the vicissitudes of historical survival of literature, or failure thereof; but, also, there is the further definitional question of identifying early fu-like pieces as full-on, actual fu, or as archetypical prototypes. There is scholarly debate regarding the origin of the fu, and the identity of the first surviving example.

A chapter of Xunzi contains a series of riddles which Idema and Haft cite theoretically as the earliest known fu, but they also cite the earliest definitively identified fu to be Jia Yi's "Fu on the Owl", composed about 170 BC.

Hellmut Wilhelm definitively identifies "the oldest fu in existence" to be by Xun Qing (also known as Hsün Ch'ing, Xun Kuang, and Xunzi), the attributed author of the Xunzi, in a chapter of which this fu is contained. Wilhelm remarks that the scholarly identification of this fu as such has been impeded by limiting examination of the piece to the series of riddles, but ignoring the immediately succeeding poems which form the coda (luan) of the fu. Wilhelm points out that the Hanshu (also known as the Book of Han) specifically refers to this as a fu. The Hanshu even specifies what categorical type or genre of fu this is, calling it a "fu of frustration", a genre (or subgenre) which later experienced significant development as the "Fu of the scholar's frustration", a name taken from the Xunzi fu.

Xun Qing ("Xun Zi") flourished ca. 312–230 BC, during the Warring States period, but the flourishing of the fu is identified with the Han dynasty, which was established in 206 BC, and with the hands of authors such as Jia Yi (200 BC – 169 BC) and Sima Xiangru (also known as Ssu-ma Hsiang-ju) (179–127 BC).

Han dynasty

Western Han
Fu achieved its greatest prominence during the early Han dynasty. On his way into exile, and upon crossing the Xiang River, Jia Yi wrote a fu named "Lament for Qu Yuan". After 3 years in exile, at sunset, an owl flew into his room: the depressed Jia Yi considered this as an omen of his exile soon reaching its miserable end, but only by means of his impending death, as signaled by this avian harbinger of doom; and so, he wrote another and subsequently renowned fu, "The Owl". After making these contributions to the Xiaoxiang poetry tradition, Jia Yi nevertheless lived on to be subsequently recalled to court. And thus, in terms of the history of the fu genre, Jia Yi's "Owl" was not even his own first fu, being written some 3 years after his "Lament for Qu Yuan" fu.

Emperor Wu of Han ascended the throne in 141 BC, and his long reign is considered the golden age of "grand fu". Emperor Wu summoned famous fu writers to the imperial court in Chang'an, where many of them composed and presented fu to the entire court.  The earliest grand fu of Emperor Wu's reign is "Seven Stimuli", by Mei Sheng (d. 140 BC). In "Seven Stimuli", Mei Sheng acts as a Warring States-style travelling orator who tries to cure a Chu prince of an illness caused by overindulgence in sensual pleasures by pushing his senses to their limits with his fu descriptions.

During the golden age of fu in the 2nd century BC, many of the greatest fu composers were from the southwestern area of Shu (modern Sichuan Province); for example, Sima Xiangru. Sima Xiangru is the most famous fu writer of Chinese history.  A native of Chengdu, he was traditionally said to have been summoned to the imperial court after Emperor Wu happened to personally read his "Fu of Sir Vacuous", though this is almost certainly a story added later. After arriving in the capital around 136 BC, Sima Xiangru expanded his "Fu of Sir Vacuous" into his magnum opus, "Fu on the Excursion Hunt of the Son of Heaven", generally considered the most famous  fu of all.  This work, often known as "Fu on the Imperial Park", after the second half of the poem, is a grand celebration of the Emperor's personal hunting park east of Chang'an, and is famed for its rich number of rare and difficult words and characters.

The grand fu of the Western Han dynasty were read and recited as celebrations of pure poetic delight, and were the first pieces of Chinese literature to fuse both unrestrained entertainment and moral admonitions together in single works.  However, after the reign of Emperor Wu, his court culture began to be criticized as having placed undue emphasis on the grandiose language in fu and therefore having missed opportunities to encourage moral restraint. The most prominent critic of "grand fu" was the other great fu writer of the Han dynasty: Yang Xiong. As a youth, Yang was an admirer and imitator of Sima Xiangru's fu, but later came to disapprove of grand fu. Yang believed that the original purpose of fu was to "indirectly admonish", but that the extended rhetorical arguments and complex vocabulary used in grand fu caused their hearers and readers to marvel at their aesthetic beauty while missing their moral messages.  Yang juxtaposed early Han dynasty fu with the fu-like expositions in the Classic of Poetry, saying that while those in the Poetry provided moral standards, the fu of the Han poets "led to excess". While known as one of the fu masters of the Han dynasty, Yang's fu are generally known for their focus on admonishing readers and listeners to uphold moral values.

Eastern Han
Two of the most famous fu writers of the Eastern Han period were the great polymaths Zhang Heng and Cai Yong. Among Zhang Heng's large corpus of writings are a significant number of fu poems, which are the first to have been written in the shorter style that became typical of post-Han fu.  Zhang's earliest known fu is "Fu on the Hot Springs", which describes the hot springs at Mount Li which famously later became a favorite of Imperial Concubine Yang during the Tang dynasty. "Fu on the Two Metropolises" is considered Zhang's masterpiece.  Zhang spent ten years gathering material for the fu, which is a response to an earlier fu by Ban Gu that is a poetic comparison between the two capitals of the Han dynasty: Luoyang and Chang'an.  Zhang's fu is highly satirical and cleverly mocks many aspects of the Western Han period, including Emperor Wu himself. The piece contains long passages colorfully describing life in the two capitals in great detail, including the entertainment areas.

Cai Yong, like Zhang Heng, was a prolific writer in addition to his mathematical, astronomical, and musical interests.  In AD 159, Cai was summoned to Chang'an to perform on the Chinese zither for the imperial court, but became ill shortly before arriving and returned to his home. Cai composed a poetic record of his journey in "Fu on Recounting a Journey", which is his most well-known fu.  In "Fu on Recounting a Journey", Cai cites examples of treacherous and dishonest rulers and officials from Chinese history, then criticizes the eunuchs of the capital for similar crimes.

A number of fu writers from the late 2nd and early 3rd centuries AD became considered great fu poets, and were noted for their descriptions of the chaos and destruction following the collapse of the Han dynasty.  Wang Can, who lived as a refugee in Chu following the assassination of Dong Zhuo in AD 192, wrote a famous fu entitled "Fu on Climbing the Tower" in which Wang movingly describes climbing a tower near Jingzhou and gazing longingly in the direction of his home in Luoyang.  Poets often used subjects of descriptive fu poems to symbolize themselves, as in "Fu on the Parrot", by Mi Heng, in which Mi uses a caged parrot as an allegory for a scholar whose talents go unrecognized and whose inability to control his tongue results in his captivity. During the Three Kingdoms period, the court of the warlord Cao Cao and his sons Cao Pi and Cao Zhi became a famous literary salon, and a number of fu poems from their court have survived to modern times.  Cao Zhi's "Fu on the Luo River Goddess" uses an ancient motif from the Verses of Chu in which the author's ultimately unfulfilled erotic desire for a goddess symbolically represents their frustration in failing to be given a high-ranking position at court or in government.

Six Dynasties
During the Six Dynasties period, fu remained a major part of contemporary poetry, although shi poetry was gradually increasing in popularity. Six Dynasties fu are generally much shorter and less extravagant than Han dynasty fu, likely due to a tradition of composing works entirely in parallel couplets that arose during the period. While lyrical fu and "fu on things" had been starkly different forms in the Han dynasty, after the 2nd century AD the distinction mostly disappeared.  Although the extravagant fu style of the Han mostly disappeared, "fu on things" continued to be widely written.

Western Jin
During the Western Jin period, fu writing moved away from the extravagant style of the Han dynasty and more toward the style of "fu on things". Rather than use fu to laud the glories of the Emperor or the Chinese empire, fu writers often wrote on humble living and mundane subjects. Pan Yue, the most famous writer of the period, wrote "Fu on my Tiny House", which describes his life enduring heat and rainstorms in a small cottage, though he actually lived in a large mansion.

Poet Shu Xi (AD 263–302), one of the most famous scholars of the Western Jin, has five fu which have survived to the present, and seem to be written in a playful style. One of Shu's fu has become well known in the history of Chinese cuisine: his "Fu on Pasta" is an encyclopedic description of a wide variety of dough-based foods, including noodles, steamed buns, and dumplings, which had not yet become the traditional Chinese foods they are in modern times.

The two most prolific fu writers of the Western Jin were Fu Xuan and his son Fu Xian, who together have 94 fu which survive today. Fu Xuan and his son's fu on things frequently involve the natural environment.  Fu Xuan has fu describing many different species of plants, fruits, and birds, of which he was especially fond. Fu Xuan's "Fu on the Running Dog", describes an especially quick racing dog.  Fu Xian wrote on topics similar to those of his father, but seems to have been particularly fascinated by insects.  His "Fu on Paper" is well known as an early description of writing paper, which had only been invented about 150 years earlier.

Eastern Jin
In AD 317, the Western Jin was conquered by a confederation of Xiongnu and Xianbei (Särbi) states, forcing huge numbers of Han Chinese aristocrats and landowners to flee to southern China.  Many of the writings from the Eastern Jin, which only controlled land south of the Yangzi River, recount the chaos following north China's conquest and try to extol the imperial power reestablished at the new Eastern Jin capital, Jiankang (modern Nanjing).

Guo Pu, who was famed for his skills in writing and divination, is considered the foremost writer of the Eastern Jin period. Guo wrote a number of fu while fleeing his hometown of Wenxi (modern Wenxi County, Shanxi Province) in the face of an invading Xiongnu army, and a number of his fu describe the large number of destroyed or deserted towns and villages throughout the Chinese heartland. Guo's "Fu on the Yangzi River", written around 317, brought him wide renown. This fu is a Han dynasty-style "grand fu" praising the Yangzi River from its origin in Sichuan (as was then believed) to its mouth at the eastern sea. Like early Han fu, the poem displays Guo's broad knowledge and familiarity with rare, obscure vocabulary and ancient legends. Another of Guo's notable fu is "Fu on Making Sacrifices to Heaven in the Southern Suburbs", a fu on the traditional ritual sacrifice to Heaven made by the Emperor. When Guo composed the fu, an altar for the sacrifice had not yet been constructed in Jiankang. Emperor Yuan of Jin was impressed by Guo's detailed description of the grand ritual, and quickly decided to reinstate it.

The general and poet Lu Ji wrote a number of fu, the best known of which is the Wen fu (Essay on literature), an essay on the nature of poetry and poetic forms.

Liu Song
The Liu family gained control of the Eastern Jin in 420, changing the name of the dynasty to Song.  A number of famous fu were composed during the Liu Song period. "Fu on the Weed-covered City" by Bao Zhao (414–466), is a moving fu on the city Guangling (modern Yangzhou), which once had been a flourishing metropolis, but in Bao's time lay abandoned after being ruined in a battle. Fu were still part of the poems composed at the imperial court, though five-syllable poems were increasingly becoming the main form of verse. In 441, Yan Yanzhi (385–433) composed a famous fu on a prized piebald horse of the Liu Song emperors, entitled "Fu on the Russet-and-white Horse", which is known for its extensive use of equine terminology and folklore.

Xie Lingyun is the best-known poet of the Liu Song period and is generally considered one of the greatest of the entire Six Dynasties period, second only to Tao Yuanming. In contrast to his older contemporary Tao, Xie is known for the difficult language, dense allusions, and frequent parallelisms of his poetry. Xie's greatest fu is "Fu on Dwelling in the Mountains", a Han-style "grand fu" describing Xie's personal estate that borrows its style from the famous "Fu on the Imperial Park" by Sima Xiangru. Like classical Han fu, the poem uses a large number of obscure and rare characters, but "Fu on Dwelling in the Mountains" is unique in that Xie included his own annotations to the poem, without which the poem would be nearly incomprehensible.

Liang
During the Liang dynasty, fu continued to be a popular form of literature, though it began to merge with the popular five- and seven-syllable poetry forms, which would completely eclipse fu during the Tang dynasty. Some fu pieces, such as Shen Yue's "Fu on Dwelling in the Suburbs", an homage to Xie Lingyun's "Fu on Dwelling in the Mountains", followed the traditional forms and subjects of classical fu, but an increasing number did not. "Fu on Lotus-picking", by Xiao Gang (later Emperor Jianwen of Liang), is a short, lyrical fu that mixes freely with popular lyric poetry, and portrayed southern China as a romantic land of pleasure and sensuality. Lotus-picking was an activity traditionally associated with peasant women, but in the early 5th century became a popular topic in fu and poetry.

Sui dynasty
The second half of the 6th century saw southern China conquered by the northern kingdoms and eventually incorporated into the Sui dynasty in 589. Soon after the south's fall, Emperor Wen of Sui ordered its capital, Jiankang, razed to the ground: all buildings in the city and its walls were completely demolished, and the land turned into fields. Many notable writers were forced back to the north, and much of the writing of the early Sui dynasty is in the form of stories of survival.

The most famous writers of the late Six Dynasties and early Sui periods are Yan Zhitui and Yu Xin. Yan's most well-known fu is "Fu on Contemplating My Life", which gives an account of Yan's entire life, itself having spanned four separate dynasties. This fu contains Yan's personal annotations added in between various lines in normal prose, and shows Yan's concern that northerners of his generation, as well as members of future generations, would learn of the chaos that had taken place in the south through his writing.

Yu Xin is generally considered the last great fu poet of Chinese history. Yu, like Yan Zhitui, was born in the south but forced to relocate to northern China after the south's defeat, and spent the rest of his career writing of the loss of the south as a loss of an entire culture and way of life. Yu's most famous piece is "Fu on Lamenting the South", in which he describes his life's experiences in the context of the larger context of the destruction of the south and its culture.

Tang and Song dynasties
The fu genre changed rapidly during the Tang dynasty. During the early Tang, a new form of fu called "regulated fu" supplanted the original form. "Regulated fu" had strict rules of form and expression, and required the use of consistent rhymes throughout each piece. Additionally, rules were created to govern the arrangement of tones in each poem, as the introduction of Buddhist texts written in Sanskrit and Pali had stimulated the Chinese the study of their own language and the identification of the four tones of Middle Chinese. Beginning in the Tang dynasty, these "regulated fu" were required for the composition sections of the imperial examinations. Tang writers added new topics to the traditional subjects of fu, such as purely moral topics or scenes from Chinese antiquity. The "parallel fu" was another variant of the fu developed in the Tang, and was only used for rhetorical compositions.

In 826, Tang poet Du Mu's poem "Fu on E-pang Palace" laid the foundation for a new form of fu called "prose fu", in which prose is freely rhymed.  This form of fu became the dominant fu form during the late Tang and the Song dynasty. By the 9th and 10th centuries, traditional fu had become mainly historical pursuits, and were largely read and copied because of their inclusion on the imperial examinations.

Later
Fu continued to be written after the demise of the Song dynasty, but these later fu have generally received less scholarly attention.

See also
Classical Chinese poetry forms
Han poetry
Xiaoxiang poetry

Notes

References
Footnotes

Works cited
Davis, A. R., ed. (1970). The Penguin Book of Chinese Verse. Baltimore: Penguin Books.
Frankel, Hans H. (1978). The Flowering Plum and the Palace Lady. New Haven, London: Yale University Press 
Hawkes, David, translation, introduction, and notes (2011 [1985]). Qu Yuan et al., The Songs of the South: An Ancient Chinese Anthology of Poems by Qu Yuan and Other Poets. London: Penguin Books. 
Idema, Wilt; Haft, Lloyd (1997). A Guide to Chinese Literature. Ann Arbor: Center for Chinese Studies, University of Michigan. 
Owen, Stephen, ed. (2010). The Cambridge History of Chinese Literature, vol. 1.  Cambridge: Cambridge University Press. 
Kern, Martin. "Early Chinese literature, beginnings through Western Han", 1–115.
Knechtges, David R. "From the Eastern Han through the Western Jin (AD 25–317)", 116–198.
Murck, Alfreda (2000). Poetry and Painting in Song China: The Subtle Art of Dissent. Cambridge (Massachusetts) and London: Harvard University Asia Center for the Harvard-Yenching Institute. .
Owen, Stephen. "The cultural Tang (650–1020)", 286–380.
Tian, Xiaofei (田晓菲). "From the Eastern Jin through the early Tang (317–649)", 199–285.
Wilhelm, Hellmut (1967 [1957]). "The Scholar's Frustration: Notes on a Type of Fu", in Chinese Thought and Institutions, John K. Fairbank, editor. Chicago and London: University of Chicago Press.

Chinese poetry forms
Han dynasty poetry